Bikkulovo (Biqqol) is a rural locality (a village) in Durasovsky Selsoviet, Chishminsky District, Bashkortostan, Russia. The population was 120 as of 2010. There are 3 streets.

Geography 
Bikkulovo is located 26 km south of Chishmy (the district's administrative centre) by road. Penza is the nearest rural locality.

References 

Rural localities in Chishminsky District